Voter turnout is the percentage of registered voters who cast a ballot in an election. The following presents voter turnout figures for Canada's general elections as compiled by Elections Canada.

The average voter turnout for Canada's general elections since 1867 has been 70.5%
The highest voter turnouts were in 1958, 1960, and 1963, when voter turnout was over 79%.
The lowest voter turnout on record was in 2008, when voter turnout fell to only 58.8%.
Voter turnout in the 2011 federal election, at 61.4%, was the third lowest in Canadian history.
Voter turnout rose sharply in the 2015 federal election to 68.5%, the highest turnout since 1993.
Voter turnout has decreased since 2015 and dropped 4.3% from 48.8% in 2019 to 44.5% in 2021.

When low turnout reflects disenchantment or indifference, the election may not be an accurate reflection of the will of the people. Low turnouts can lead to unequal representation among various parts of the population. In developed countries, non-voters tend to be concentrated in particular demographic and socioeconomic groups, especially the young and the poor.

The relationship between voting behaviour and voting turnout 
Voter turnouts and voting behaviour are two fundamental elements of elections in order to have a fully functioning democracy. The voting behaviour of electorates has a large impact on the voter turnout and certain areas of behaviour can cause a low turnout in votes. The voter turnout for recent (post 2019) elections have declined and there is debate as to why this has happened. Examples of short term influences of voting behaviour on voter turnout in Canada are as follows:

 Voters perceptions of the state of the national economy and who will be the best person for improving the economy. This could also link to the appeal of the politicians policies and how effective they will be. 
 Voters personal economic situations. 
 Gendered voting, for example whether it is a female politician. There is evidence to suggest that women are more likely to vote for a female politician than a male politician and vice versa; this is known as gender consciousness. This is due to idea that they share the same characteristics. 
 Age. 
 Race and ethnicity.
 Education levels of voters.

Voter turnout in Canada's general elections

See also 
Canadian electoral system
Elections in Canada
Fair Vote Canada
List of Canadian federal general elections
Young voter turnout in Canada

References

External links 
 Voter Turnout in the 2008 Canadian Election - Voter Turnout in Historical Perspective Simon Fraser University
 Voter Turnout in Canada MapleLeafWeb.com
 Voter turnout CBC.ca
 Voter Turnout at Federal Elections and Referendums, 1867-2008 Elections Canada
 Elections Canada website for young voters
 Apathy Is Boring apathyisboring.com
 Student Vote studentvote.ca
 We're #11. How embarrassing. May 1, 2011
 Canada election: High turnout in early voting, BBC News, April 27, 2011
 Middle East protests inspiring Canadians to vote May 1, 2011
 Low voter turnout Monday helps deliver Conservatives' coveted majority May 3, 2011

Politics of Canada
Government in Canada
Elections in Canada
Canadian federal elections
Electoral reform in Canada